The Monument to Brotherhood in Arms was erected in  in Warsaw's Praga district, in 1945, to commemorate the joint fight of Polish and Soviet soldiers against Nazi Germany. In 2011, it was temporarily taken down during the construction of an underground railway station and sent to restorers. However, when it was about to be reinstalled, a minority of Praga's residents objected, as they perceived the monument as a remnant of the Communist era. In surveys carried out by the city council and Gazeta Wyborcza in 2012 and 2013 respectively, the majority of Warsaw's residents said they would like the monument to be returned to its original place or placed somewhere nearby. In  2015, the Warsaw City Council overturned its earlier decision to return the monument and made the removal permanent.

The monument was colloquially known as "the four sleepers or "the four mourners" (pomnik „czterech śpiących”, „czterech smutnych”), in reference to the figures of two Polish and two Soviet soldiers with bowed heads at the four corners of the monument.

References

Monuments and memorials in Warsaw
World War II monuments and memorials in Poland
1945 sculptures
Soviet military memorials and cemeteries in Poland
Poland–Soviet Union relations
Removed statues